The list of ship commissionings in 1938 includes a chronological list of all ships commissioned in 1938.


See also 

1938
 Ship commissionings